For the 1995 Rugby World Cup in South Africa, the Confederation of African Rugby was allocated one direct qualifying place (Africa 1) in addition to the automatic qualifying place granted to  as host of tournament.

Seven teams participated in the qualification tournament. The teams were split into two pools for the first stage held in 1993, with the matches in Pool A taking place in Nairobi and the matches in Pool B being played in Tunis. the two top teams in each pool progressed to the second stage which was another round robin held at Casablanca in 1994.  was the first placed team after the second stage and secured qualification for the 1995 tournament.

Africa

Round 1
Group A

 and  Qualified for the Round 2

Group B

 and  Qualified for the Round 2

Round 2
Final Qualifying Group

 qualified for the 1995 Rugby World Cup

References

1995
Africa
1994 rugby union tournaments for national teams
1994 in African rugby union
International rugby union competitions hosted by Kenya
International rugby union competitions hosted by Tunisia
International rugby union competitions hosted by Morocco
1994 in Kenyan sport
1994 in Tunisian sport
1994 in Moroccan sport